Kim Ji-hyeon (born 22 July 1996) is a South Korean footballer who plays as forward for Gimcheon Sangmu FC.

Career
Kim joined K League 1 side Gangwon FC before 2018 season starts.

Club
As of 29 May 2021

Honours

Individual
 K League Young Player of the Year: 2019

References

1996 births
Living people
Association football forwards
South Korean footballers
Gangwon FC players
K League 1 players